Langley Mill railway station (formerly known as Langley Mill for Heanor and Langley Mill and Eastwood) on the Erewash Valley Line serves the village of Langley Mill and the towns of Heanor in Derbyshire and Eastwood in Nottinghamshire, England.

The station lies between Nottingham and Sheffield and is managed by East Midlands Railway.

Services
Northern Trains run an hourly service between Nottingham and  via  that stops at Langley Mill. This service started from the December 2008 timetable change.

East Midlands Railway operate a few services per day from Langley Mill southbound to Nottingham and beyond (usually Norwich) and northbound to Sheffield (usually continuing to Liverpool Lime Street).

Buses that serve Langley Mill are Rainbow 1, 33, 34 and others that can be found on the Trent Barton website.

Facilities
The station is unstaffed and has two offset platforms (linked by underpass), with platform 1 (for Chesterfield and Sheffield) the more southerly of the pair.  There are no permanent buildings other than standard waiting shelters; there is no ticket machine available, so all tickets must be purchased prior to travel or on the train. Digital CIS displays, automatic announcements, timetable poster boards and customer help points on each side provide train running information.  Step-free access is only available to platform 1 (via ramp, platform 2 is reachable only by stairs).

History

 
The station was opened on the Erewash Valley Line by the Midland Railway in 1847 and known as Langley Mill for Heanor. However, in 1876, the GNR built Eastwood and Langley Mill on its branch from the Derbyshire and Staffordshire Extension at Awsworth Junction. The Midland station then became Langley Mill and Eastwood.

In 1895, the Midland built a line from here through Heanor to Ripley with an adjacent station of its own.  This was not profitable and closed in May 1926.

The former station (which was demolished after closure) had platforms opposite each other and was located on the site of the present platform 2. A new northbound platform had to be provided when the station was rebuilt, as the former site north of Station Road had been redeveloped. This is located close to where the old Ripley branch line platform once stood.

Stationmasters

Richard Eaton until 1861
J.C. Hayes from 1861 (formerly station master at Borrowash)
James Hay ca. 1866
Edward Eagle 1868 - 1898 (formerly station master at Stapleford and Sandiacre)
Richard Withnall Wain 1898 - 1911
Samuel Eaton 1911 - 1926
William Tunn 1926 - 1937 (formerly station master at Alfreton)

References

External links

Railway stations in Derbyshire
DfT Category F1 stations
Former Midland Railway stations
Railway stations in Great Britain opened in 1847
Railway stations in Great Britain closed in 1967
Railway stations in Great Britain opened in 1986
Reopened railway stations in Great Britain
Railway stations served by East Midlands Railway
Northern franchise railway stations
Beeching closures in England
1847 establishments in England
Charles Trubshaw railway stations
Eastwood, Nottinghamshire